Boston 8-Bit is a music/arts collective based in Boston, Massachusetts, that features 8-bit, chiptune, and glitch music. The collective began as a website created by Chris Mahoney (AKA chiptune artist Active Knowledge) and James Therrien (BRIGHT PRIMATE) to publicise the chiptune music scene in and around Boston.

From October 2009, the collective has created a concert series in Boston, called "Boston 8-Bit presents: Chiptune", which features local, new and veteran musicians from across the country who use gaming systems (particularly the Game Boy and the NES) to produce electronic music and video game art.

Current members
Active Knowledge
Astro Logic
Best Defense/Death's Medicine
Bifflecup
Battlemode
Diamond Machine
Glenntai 
MC facepalm
Robot Sex Music
Sam Mulligan
T-T)b
Unicorn Princess

Associated acts
Facundo
Moncrey
Owen McGarry
Rat King
Vickysbooties
Disasterpeace

See also
Chiptune
8-bit (music)
Game Boy music
Glitch (music)
Video Game Music

References

External links
Official website 
 
Boston Metro interviews Chris Mahoney of Active Knowledge 
Active Knowledge on MySpace Music
BR1GHT PR1MATE on MySpace Music
Vickysbooties on MySpace Music

Electronic music groups from Massachusetts
Musical groups from Boston